Hebridean Air Services is a small Scottish airline based in northern Scotland owned by Airtask Group Ltd. The airline flies charter, scenic, aerial photography and scheduled flights.

It is the only airline to operate a service between Oban and Islay, Coll, Tiree and Colonsay islands; routes subsidised by Argyll and Bute Council.

Destinations

While the airline's primary base is Oban Airport, where scheduled flights are operated from, it offers charter services to over 40 airports and airfields within Scotland.

Fleet

As of January 2017 the Hebridean Air Services fleet consists of the following aircraft:

Previously operated
 Britten-Norman BN2A Mk. III-1 Trislander

References

External links
 Official website

Airlines of Scotland
Airlines of the United Kingdom
Airlines established in 1995
Companies of Scotland
Organisations based in Inverness
Transport in Argyll and Bute